This list of presidents of the Church of Jesus Christ includes all presidents of the Church of Jesus Christ (Bickertonite).

References
"New President of the Church of Jesus Christ (Bickerton)", JWHA Newsletter, no. 75, 3rd quarter 2005, p. 13.
The Church of Jesus Christ (n.d.). "Brother Paul Palmieri".

Leaders in the Church of Jesus Christ (Bickertonite)
Latter Day Saint movement lists
Presidents of the Church of Jesus Christ (Bickertonite)